The Samsung Brightside is a touch-screen messaging phone launched March 1, 2012 on Verizon Wireless. It features a 3.1" (inch) touch-screen display, with a resolution of 320 by 240 pixels, a full slide-out QWERTY keyboard, as well as a 3.2 mega-pixel camera/camcorder. It includes other features like Voice Commands, VZ Navigator, a document viewer, and an Opera Mini web browser for fast Internet browsing.

External links
Official Website

Brightside
Mobile phones introduced in 2012